Alfred Haines may refer to:

Alfred Haines (cricketer) (1877–1935), English cricketer for Gloucestershire
Alfred Haines (pilot) (1898–1918), British World War I flying ace
Alfred Haines House on National Register of Historic Places listings in San Diego County, California

See also
Alfred Haynes (disambiguation)